Elections to North Tyneside Metropolitan Council took place on 22 May 2014. They coincided with other local elections happening in the UK that day, as well as the 2014 election to the European Parliament.

North Tyneside Council is elected "in thirds" which means one councillor from each three-member ward is elected each year with a fourth year when the mayoral election takes place.

One third of the councillors were elected in 2010 and the results below are compared to the last time the seats were fought, in 2012, or at by-elections in the case of Riverside and Wallsend.

Resulting Political Composition

Candidates by party

There were a total of 75 candidates standing across the 20 seats - an average of 3.75 in each ward. The Labour Party, Conservative Party and United Kingdom Independence Party all fielded a full slate of 20 candidates. The Liberal Democrats fielded 7 candidates, whilst there were 4 Independents, 3 candidates representing the Trade Unionist and Socialist Coalition and 1 candidate representing the Green Party.

Since the last local election in 2012, the number of candidates representing Labour, the Conservatives and Liberal Democrats was unchanged. UKIP, the TUSC and Green Party fielded no candidates in the 2012 election, so had increases of 20, 3 and 1 respectively. There were no Independent candidates in the 2012 election so there was an increase of 4.

Battle Hill

Benton

Camperdown

Chirton

Collingwood

Cullercoats

Howdon

Killingworth

Longbenton

Monkseaton North

Monkseaton South

Northumberland

Preston

Riverside

A by-election was held in July 2013, and the changes are reflected from that result.

St. Mary's

Tynemouth

Valley

Wallsend

A by-election was held in held in November 2012, and the changes are reflected from that result.

Weetslade

Whitley Bay

2014
2014 English local elections
21st century in Tyne and Wear